Sammy Arnold (born 8 April 1996) is an English-born, Irish rugby union player for French club Brive. He plays as a centre.

Early life
Born in Redhill, Surrey, Arnold moved to Kent aged five and attended a state school until sixth form, when he earned a rugby scholarship at Cranleigh School. Harlequins had shown interest in Arnold joining their academy, but as a scrum-half rather than a centre. Arnold, who wanted to play as a centre for Ireland, instead decided to join Ulster. He qualifies for Ireland through his mother, who is from Wexford – he also has a grandfather from Bere Island, County Cork.

Club career

Ulster
Arnold made his debut against Dragons at Rodney Parade in March 2015 as an 18-year-old. At the end of the season he won the Club's Academy Player of the Year award. He made his first Champions Cup appearance against Oyonnax in January 2016, but was forced off through injury after 23 minutes.

Munster
On 4 February 2016, it was announced that Arnold would be joining Ulster's provincial rivals, Munster, at the beginning of the 2016–17 season. Just weeks after joining Munster, Arnold damaged ligaments in his knee, which ruled him out of the opening period of the 2016–17 season. On 26 November 2016, Arnold made his competitive debut for Munster, starting alongside Jaco Taute in the 2016–17 Pro12 fixture against Benetton at Thomond Park. In January 2017, Arnold was ruled out for 8 weeks with a knee injury. On 27 February 2017, Arnold resumed full training following his recovering from the knee injury.

On 31 March 2017, Arnold started for Munster A in their 2016–17 British and Irish Cup semi-final against Ealing Trailfinders, scoring a try in the 25–9 win against the English Championship side at CIT. On 21 April 2017, Arnold started at 13 for Munster A in their 29–28 victory over English RFU Championship side Jersey Reds in the final of the 2016–17 British and Irish Cup, which was held in Irish Independent Park. He scored his first tries for Munster on 3 November 2017, doing so in the 2017–18 Pro14 win against Welsh side Dragons. Arnold made his European Rugby Champions Cup debut for Munster on 9 December 2017, starting in the Pool 4 fixture against Leicester Tigers in Thomond Park and earning the Man-of-the-Match award in the provinces' 33–10 win.

He was sent-off for a high tackle on Christian Lealiifano in Munster's Pro14 game against Ulster on 1 January 2018 and subsequently banned for 3 weeks. He signed a new two-year contract with Munster in February 2018. Arnold was named the Munster Rugby Young Player of the Year in April 2018.

Connacht
Arnold joined Connacht on a two-year contract in July 2020, and made his debut for the province against his old club Munster on 30 August 2020.

Brive
Arnold moved to France to join Brive, where former Ireland and British & Irish Lions player Jeremy Davidson is head coach, on a three-year contract from the 2022–23 season.

International career
After achieving selection at under-18 level in May 2013, Arnold received his first call up for the Ireland under-20 side in February 2015 for a 2015 Six Nations Under 20s Championship clash with France. 

Arnold earned his first senior call-up in October 2018, being selected in Joe Schmidt's 42-man Ireland squad for the 2018 Autumn Internationals. Arnold made his senior international debut for Ireland in their 2018 Autumn Test against the United States on 24 November 2018, coming on as a replacement for Will Addison at half-time in Ireland's 57–14 win.

Honours

Munster A
British and Irish Cup:
Winner (1): 2016–17

References

External links
Connacht Profile
Munster Profile
Ireland Profile
Pro14 Profile

U20 Six Nations Profile

1996 births
Living people
People educated at Cranleigh School
Rugby union players from Surrey
Irish rugby union players
Irish Exiles rugby union players
Ulster Rugby players
Munster Rugby players
Garryowen Football Club players
Connacht Rugby players
Ireland international rugby union players
CA Brive players
Irish expatriate rugby union players
Irish expatriate sportspeople in France
Expatriate rugby union players in France
Rugby union centres